The , or  Kōdōkan (講道館), is the headquarters of the worldwide judo community.  The kōdōkan was founded in 1882 by Kanō Jigorō, the founder of judo, and is now an eight-story building in Tokyo.

Etymology
Literally, kō (講) means "to lecture", dō (道) means "way," and kan (館) is "a public building". Together it can be translated as "a place for the study of the way."

Function

The Kodokan Institute offers classes for those who want to master judo. The program is authorized as a non-regular school by the Tokyo Metropolitan Government. Its courses include the theories and practice of judo, and matters of general education. The course is divided into two parts: a general course for novices, and special courses for those who have completed the general course or its equivalent.

The Kodokan also issues ranks, and many judoka (practitioners of judo) around the world become Kodokan members and have their ranks registered with the Kodokan.

The Institute was founded with only nine disciples. The growth of judo in its early years is demonstrated by the growth of the Kodokan itself:

 12 mats - May 1882, at the Eishōji, a Buddhist temple in Ueno
 40 mats - Spring 1887, at Shinagawa's house, Kōjimachi
 107 mats - February 1894, at Koishikawa-chō, Shimotomisaka-chō
 314 mats - January 1898, at Ōtsuka Sakashita-chō
 986 mats - March 1958, at 2-chome, Kasuga-chō, Bunkyō, Tokyo

Today, the Kodokan has 1,206 mats across the five main dojo (training halls)—Main, School, International, Women's, and Boys'—plus a special dojo for retired judoka and special technique study purposes.

Building

There are eight floors and a basement to the Kodokan dojo, each serving purposes for housing, training, and research by judoka. The basement holds the cafeteria and some conference rooms. The first floor has parking, a bank, and a store. The second floor contains a library and more conference rooms. The third floor is for judoka and visitors who are living in the dojo. The fourth floor contains dressing rooms. The fifth, sixth, and seventh floors are all used for training space (the seventh floor is called the Main Dojo), and the eighth floor is for spectators and has seats that look down into the main space of the seventh floor.

Research floor
The Kano Memorial Hall, Historical hall, exhibition room, and material stock room are located on the second floor. The halls contain posters of the development of judo, as well as information on some of the great masters of the system, written documents, photographs, and other information on the life of Kano and the people he met through his travels. The extensive library on the second floor holds over 7,000 books pertaining to judo, and is planned to be increased eventually.

There are four research laboratories on the second floor:
1st Lab: Theoretical and historical study of judo.
2nd Lab: Psychological study of judo.
3rd Lab: Technical analysis of judo. Research on the physical strength of judo players.
4th Lab: Physiological study of judo.

The research staff use fundamental and applied science to work with foreign researchers. Research is displayed to the public and free of charge to view once during the year.

Living in the Kodokan
Judoka visiting and training in the Kodokan can stay on the Third Floor. There are five rooms for use during training camps; these rooms can hold 20 people each. Judo sensei and players (when no camp is in session) may live in suites for either one or two people; these suites have their own baths and showers.

 the lodging fees are as follows:
 Room for training camps : 1 night / person 1,800 yen ($15.21 US)
 Single room : 1 night / person 3,500 yen ($29.58 US)
 Deluxe single room : 1 night / person 5,000 yen ($42.26 US)
 Deluxe twin room : 1 night / person 9,000 yen ($76.07 US)
 Extra bed : each 1,800 yen ($15.21 US)

Visiting the Kodokan
Short-term visitors to Tokyo can visit the Kodokan to watch or attend practice. Visitors may walk up to the main floor of the dojo to watch practice or competitions. Permission is required to attend the practice for transient students. One-time visitors are most likely to be allowed to take part in a randori session with foreign students.

Main floor
The Main Dojo is found on the seventh floor. The dojo is carefully designed to give the precise amount of floor spring, brightness, and ventilation. Four official contests can be held at the same time in the Main Dojo on the seventh floor. It has 420 mats and approximately 900 spectators can be seated on the eighth floor. Medical equipment is provided in case of emergencies.

Attire
Only white judogi (judo uniforms) are generally allowed in the Kodokan (except for special occasions and foreign guests for whom they may show some tolerance). Wearing blue or any other color judogi is considered disrespectful, as the white judogi is traditional and has cultural significance. Undershirts for men are not allowed.

See also
 Kōdōkan Shitennō
 Jujutsu
 List of Kodokan Judo techniques
Hombu dojo

References

External links

 Kodokan website
 "Judo History" - Judo history pages at JudoInfo.com
 Ohlenkamp, Neil (2006) Judo Unleashed basic reference on judo. .
 Ohlenkamp, Neil Kodokan Judo - at JudoInfo.com
 A History of the Kodokan - University of Montana Judo website.
 Two months of training at the Kodokan - Description of life in the Kodokan Hostel.

Sports organizations established in 1882
1882 establishments in Japan
Dōjō
Buildings and structures in Bunkyō
Judo venues